The handball competition at the 2014 Central American and Caribbean Games will be held in Veracruz, Mexico from 15 to 26 November 2014 at the Centro Deportivo Carlos Serdán Arechavaleta.

Qualification

Medal summary

Women's tournament

Group A

Group B

Knockout stage

5th–8th place playoffs

5th 8th place playoffs

Semifinals

7th-place match

5th-place match

Bronze medal match

Gold medal match

Final standing

Men's tournament

Group A

Group B

Knockout stage

5th–8th place playoffs

Final standing

Medal table

References

External links
 Official Website

2014 Central American and Caribbean Games events
2014 in handball
Qualification tournaments for the 2015 Pan American Games
Handball at the Central American and Caribbean Games